Ernesto De Curtis (4 October 1875 – 31 December 1937) was an Italian composer.

Born in Naples, the son of Giuseppe De Curtis and Elisabetta Minnon, he was a great-grandson of composer Saverio Mercadante and the brother of poet Giambattista De Curtis, with whom he wrote the song "Torna a Surriento".  He studied piano and received a diploma from the Conservatory of San Pietro a Maiella in Naples.

He died at Naples in 1937.

Works

He wrote over a hundred songs, including:
"Torna a Surriento" - 1902
"Voce 'e notte" - 1904
"Canta pe' me" - 1909
"Non ti scordar di me" (lyrics by Libero Bovio) - 1912
"Sona chitarra" - 1913
"Tu ca nun chiagne" - 1915
"Duorme Carmé'" 
"Ti voglio tanto bene"
"Non ti scordar di me" (lyrics by Domenico Furnò) - 1935

References

External links
 

1875 births
1937 deaths
Musicians from Naples
19th-century Italian composers
Italian male composers
19th-century Italian male musicians
20th-century Italian composers
20th-century Italian male musicians